"Where Your Road Leads" is a song written by Victoria Shaw and Desmond Child, and recorded by American country music artists Trisha Yearwood and Garth Brooks. It was released in September 1998 as the second single and title track from Yearwood's album Where Your Road Leads.  The song reached #18 on the Billboard Hot Country Singles & Tracks chart.

Shaw previously recorded the song on her 1995 album In Full View.

Critical reception
Deborah Evans Price, of Billboard magazine reviewed the song favorably, calling it a "gorgeous lyric." She goes on to say that Yearwood's "strong, supple voice beautifully conveys the passionate commitment in the words, and Brooks' warm demeanor provides affecting support." On the production, she say that it at times, "comes perilously close to bombast."

Chart performance
"Where Your Road Leads" debuted at number 58 on the U.S. Billboard Hot Country Singles & Tracks for the week of September 19, 1998.

References

1998 singles
Trisha Yearwood songs
Garth Brooks songs
Male–female vocal duets
Songs written by Desmond Child
Songs written by Victoria Shaw (singer)
Song recordings produced by Allen Reynolds
MCA Nashville Records singles
1995 songs